The 1987–88 Greek Football Cup was the 46th edition of the Greek Football Cup.

Tournament details

Totally 70 teams participated, 16 from Alpha Ethniki, 18 from Beta, and 36 from Gamma. It was held in 7 rounds, included final. An Additional Round was held between First and Second, with 3 matches, in order that the teams would continue to be 32.

It was an enough eventful year, that was marked by hard confrontations in the cases of "strong" pairs. In Third Round, Olympiacos eliminated AEK Athens with 1–1 draw at home and 3–1 win away, in a much debated match (there were allegations for some of AEK 's players being bribed to have low performance).In semi-finals, Olympiacos eliminated cup winners, OFI, and Panathinaikos the champions of the season, AEL.

The Final between the eternal enemies was an opportunity for a good season ending with a title, as both teams were struggling in the championship. The match was nervous, however kept effervescent interesting until the end, since it was judged on the penalty shootout, after a 2–2 draw (3 out of 4 goals was scored by penalties). Nikos Sarganis was the man of the match, warding off two shots and scoring one in the process. For Olympiacos it was the third time that they lost a cup final on penalty shootout (the other two in 1974 and 1976). Dimitris Saravakos with 10 goals was the top scorer.

Calendar

Knockout phase
Each tie in the knockout phase, apart from the first two rounds and the final, was played over two legs, with each team playing one leg at home. The team that scored more goals on aggregate over the two legs advanced to the next round. If the aggregate score was level, the away goals rule was applied, i.e. the team that scored more goals away from home over the two legs advanced. If away goals were also equal, then extra time was played. The away goals rule was again applied after extra time, i.e. if there were goals scored during extra time and the aggregate score was still level, the visiting team advanced by virtue of more away goals scored. If no goals were scored during extra time, the winners were decided by a penalty shoot-out. In the first two rounds and the final, which were played as a single match, if the score was level at the end of normal time, extra time was played, followed by a penalty shoot-out if the score was still level.The mechanism of the draws for each round is as follows:
There are no seedings, and teams from the same group can be drawn against each other.

First round

|}

Additional round

|}

Bracket

Round of 32

|}

Round of 16

|}

Quarter-finals

|}

Semi-finals

|}

Final

The 44th Greek Cup Final was played at the Olympic Stadium.

References

External links
Greek Cup 1987-88 at RSSSF

Greek Football Cup seasons
Greek Cup
Cup